Nikolay Nikolov may refer to:

Nikolay Nikolov (actor) (born 1964), Bulgarian actor
Nikolay Nikolov (footballer, born 1981), Bulgarian footballer
Nikolay Nikolov (footballer, born 1985), Bulgarian football player for Botev Vratsa
Nikolay Nikolov (mathematician)
Nikolay Nikolov (pentathlete) (born 1954), Bulgarian modern pentathlete
Nikolay Nikolov (pole vaulter) (born 1964), Bulgarian pole vaulter
Nikolay Nikolov (volleyball) (born 1986), Bulgarian volleyball player